William Fairbrother was a Canadian ice hockey player who is credited with inventing the ice hockey net in the 1890s.  During the 1880s, Fairbrother played for Beamsville, Ontario's Men's Hockey team. At first, two poles or two rocks served as goals, and an official would watch to see if a puck passed through the goal.  However, disputes arose over goals and biased officiating. Then, Fairbrother, who played as a goaltender, got a net from a local fisherman and strung it from the poles. Players were immediately more satisfied with the new system.

The Ontario Hockey Association soon thereafter credited Fairbrother with the idea. Hockey Hall of Fame records indicate that Fairbrother's idea happened in 1897 or 1898. The Jordan Historical Museum of the Twenty held an exhibit on Fairbrother. In February 1997, the town Lincoln, Ontario designated Fairbrother's home a historical site.

References

History of ice hockey
Ice hockey people from Ontario
Year of birth missing
Year of death missing